is a passenger railway station located in the city of Kasai, Hyōgo Prefecture, Japan, operated by the third-sector Hōjō Railway Company.

Lines
Osa Station is served by the Hōjō Line and is 9.8 kilometers from the terminus of the line at Ao Station.

Station layout
The station consists of one side platform serving a single bi-directional track. The station is unattended.

Adjacent stations

History
Osa Station opened on March 3, 1915. The station building and platform were registered by the national government as a National Registered Tangible Cultural Property in 2014.

Passenger statistics
In fiscal 2018, the station was used by an average of 35 passengers daily.

Surrounding area
  Shimosato River

See also
List of railway stations in Japan

References

External links
 
  

Railway stations in Hyōgo Prefecture
Railway stations in Japan opened in 1915
Kasai, Hyōgo
Registered Tangible Cultural Properties